Kappa Reticuli (κ Reticuli) is a binary star system in the southern constellation of Reticulum. It is visible to the naked eye, having a combined apparent visual magnitude of +4.71. Based upon an annual parallax shift of 46.12 mas as seen from Earth, it is located 71 light-years from the Sun. Based upon its space velocity components, this star is a member of the Hyades supercluster of stars that share a common motion through space.

Houk and Cowley (1978) catalogued the yellow-hued primary, component A, with a stellar classification of F3 IV/V, indicating this is an F-type star that showing mixed traits of a main-sequence and a more evolved subgiant star. Later, Grey et al. (2006) listed a class of F3 V, suggesting it is an F-type main-sequence star. It is emitting a statistically significant amount of infrared excess, suggesting the presence of an orbiting debris disk. The secondary, component B, is an orange-hued star with a visual magnitude of 10.4 at an angular separation of 54 arcseconds from the primary.

References

F-type subgiants
Double stars
Reticuli, Kappa
Reticulum (constellation)
Durchmusterung objects
022001
016245
1083
M-type main-sequence stars